Destiny Has No Favorites (Spanish: El destino no tiene favoritos) is a 2003 Peruvian romantic comedy film written and directed by Alvaro Velarde.

Synopsis 
When Ana's husband rents the garden of his house for the filming of a soap opera, the woman finds herself involved in a production dominated by a power game where blackmail and intrigue prevail.

Cast 
The actors participating in this film are:

 Angie Cepeda as María
 Celine Aguirre as Magda
 Tatiana Astengo as Oliva
 Bernie Paz as Alejandro
 Monica Steuer as Ana
 Javier Valdéz as Ernesto
 Paul Vega as Nicolás
 Elena Romero as Virtudes
 Rebeca Ráez as Martina

References

External links 

 

2003 films
2003 romantic comedy films
Peruvian romantic comedy films
2000s Peruvian films
2000s Spanish-language films

Films set in Peru
Films shot in Peru
Films about television people